CBP may refer to:

Business parks
 Cebu Business Park, a central business district in Cebu City, Philippines
 Changi Business Park, an eco-friendly industrial park in Singapore
 Chiswick Business Park, a business park in Gunnersbury, West London

Science and technology
 Contention based protocol
 CREB-binding protein a protein used in human transcriptional coactivation
 Calcium-binding protein
 Coded Block Pattern, a term used in video compression
 Constrained Baseline Profile, the simplest of H.264/MPEG-4 AVC profiles

Transport
 Cangzhou West railway station, China Railway telegraph code CBP
 Castle Bar Park railway station, National Rail station code CBP

Other uses
 Captive bolt pistol
 Certified Benefits Professional, a certification for human-resource personnel
 Chorleywood Bread Process
 Citizens Bank Park, a baseball stadium used by the Philadelphia Phillies
 Columbia Basin Project, a large irrigation network in central Washington
 Crippled Black Phoenix, a British rock band
 U.S. Customs and Border Protection, the largest federal law enforcement agency of the United States Department of Homeland Security